Germain's swiftlet (Aerodramus germani) is a species of swift.

It is found in China, Indonesia, Laos, Malaysia, Myanmar, the Philippines, Singapore, Thailand, and Vietnam. Its natural habitats are subtropical or tropical moist lowland forests and subtropical or tropical moist montane forests.

Description
This swiftlet is 12 cm long and weighs 13 to 14 grams. The plumage is blackish-brown above, but much paler on the underparts. The tail is slightly forked and the wings are long and narrow. The bill and feet are black. The nominate subspecies C. g. germani from Hainan south to Thailand and northern Malaysia has a whitish rump, but  C. g. amechanus of the rest of Malaysia has a grey rump. These two forms are sometimes considered to be subspecies of the edible-nest swiftlet.

Several calls are uttered including a loud zwing and various chip calls used for echolocation in dark caves.

Himalayan swiftlet winters within the range of Germain's swiftlet, but is larger and bulkier, and has a greyer rump than C. g. germani.

Behaviour
This swiftlet feeds over a range of habitats from coastal areas to the mountains. Its diet consists of flying insects which are caught on the wing. It often feeds in large flocks with other species of swift and swallow.

It breeds in colonies in caves, in a cleft in a cliff or sometimes on a building. The bracket-shaped nest is white and translucent and is made of layers of hardened saliva attached to the rock. It measures about 6 cm across with a depth of 1.5 cm and a weight of about 14 grams. Two white, oval, non-glossy eggs are laid.

Status
Germain's swiftlet has an extensive range, estimated at 1–10 million square kilometres (0.4–3.8 million square miles), and a large population. The species is not believed to approach the thresholds for the population decline criterion of the IUCN Red List (i.e., declining more than 30% in ten years or three generations), and is therefore evaluated as Least Concern.

References

Germain's swiftlet
Birds of Malesia
Germain's swiftlet
Taxonomy articles created by Polbot
Taxobox binomials not recognized by IUCN